Time to Die is the eighth studio album by English doom metal band Electric Wizard, released on 29 September 2014. It is their debut on Spinefarm, having left Rise Above. The album is the first since 2002’s Let Us Prey to feature founding member Mark Greening on drums.

The album is the longest Electric Wizard studio album to date (excluding bonus tracks and the added silence at the end of Dopethrone).

Track listing

Personnel

Electric Wizard
 Jus Oborn – guitar, vocals, bass
 Liz Buckingham – guitar
 Mark Greening – drums, Hammond organ

Guest musicians
  Count Orlof  – bass

Production
 Chris Fielding – mixing
  Jus Oborn – production

Charts

References

2014 albums
Electric Wizard albums